The 1779 English cricket season was the eighth in which matches have been awarded retrospective first-class cricket status. The scorecards of five first-class matches have survived.

Matches
Five first-class match scorecards survive from 1779, four of them matches between England sides and Hampshire XIs.

14–15 June – Hampshire XI v England – Itchin Stoke Down
23–26 June – England v Hampshire XI – Sevenoaks Vine
9–11 August – Surrey XI v Kent XI – Laleham Burway
23 August – Hampshire XI v England – Broadhalfpenny Down
13–16 September – England v Hampshire XI – Moulsey Hurst

Five other matches are known to have been played during the season, including a match between Kent and Surrey at Bourne Paddock in July which was badly affected by rain. Others include early references to cricket in both Berkshire and Oxfordshire.

First-class debutants
 Berwick (Surrey and Hampshire)

References

Further reading
 
 
 
 
 

1779 in English cricket
English cricket seasons in the 18th century